The first season of the American television drama series Sons of Anarchy premiered on September 3, 2008, and concluded on November 26, 2008, after 13 episodes aired on cable network FX. It is also the only season to air on Wednesdays before the show moved to Tuesdays for the remainder of its run. Created by Kurt Sutter, it is about the lives of a close-knit outlaw motorcycle club operating in Charming, a fictional town in California's Central Valley. The show centers on protagonist Jackson "Jax" Teller (Charlie Hunnam), the vice president of the motorcycle club, who begins questioning the club and himself.

Sons of Anarchy is the story of the Teller-Morrow family of Charming, California, as well as other members of the Sons of Anarchy Motorcycle Club, Redwood Original (SAMCRO), their families, various Charming townspeople, allied and rival gangs, associates, and law agencies that undermine or support SAMCRO's legal and illegal enterprises.

Plot
The series begins with the destruction of a warehouse the club uses to store and assemble guns, which is their main source of income, by a rival MC right before the overdose of Jax's Methamphetamine-addicted, pregnant ex-wife Wendy. An emergency C-section is performed, and their son Abel is delivered ten weeks prematurely. Jax finds his father's memoirs when he visits a storage unit to collect some old baby clothes. John Teller, Jax's father, was one of the founders of SAMCRO, and the book describes his trials with and hopes for the club. Jax's mother, Gemma Teller-Morrow, is now married to the President of SAMCRO, Clay Morrow. Jax's best friend Opie has just been released from prison for serving time for a club-related crime. The first season deals with Jax trying to reconcile things happening to the club with what he reads in his father's memoirs, Opie trying to take a lesser role in the club, and local and federal law enforcement trying to shut down SAMCRO.

Cast and characters

Main cast
 Charlie Hunnam as Jackson "Jax" Teller, a disillusioned club member who is Vice President of the Sons of Anarchy Motorcycle Club Redwood Original in Charming. He discovers a written diary by his late father John that makes him question his life and the club.  
 Katey Sagal as Gemma Teller Morrow, Jax's mother and the queen of Charming. She is the matriarch of the club through her marriage to President Clay Morrow. 
 Mark Boone Junior as Robert "Bobby Elvis" Munson, the Secretary and a former Vice President of SAMCRO, in Charming.
 Kim Coates as Alexander "Tig" Trager, a former Sergeant-at-Arms at the club.
 Tommy Flanagan as Filip "Chibs" Telford, a club member from Glasgow, Scotland. He is SAMCRO's connection with the IRA. 
 Johnny Lewis as Kip "Half Sack" Epps, a prospect (prospective member) of the club, who often gets hazed by the club and is given undesirable tasks. 
 Maggie Siff as Dr. Tara Knowles Jax's high-school sweetheart. She performs successful surgery on his premature child Abel. 
 Ron Perlman as Clarence "Clay" Morrow, the President of SAMCRO. He is Jax's step-father and Gemma's husband.

Special guest cast
 Drea de Matteo as Wendy Case, Jax's ex-wife and Abel Teller's biological mother. She is a meth addict.
 Ally Walker as Agent June Stahl
 Tom Everett Scott as Rosen 
 Brian Van Holt as Kyle Hobart

Recurring cast 
 Dayton Callie as Chief Wayne Unser 
 Theo Rossi as Juan-Carlos "Juice" Ortiz 
 Ryan Hurst as Harry "Opie" Winston 
 Taylor Sheridan as Deputy Chief David Hale 
 William Lucking as Piermont "Piney" Winston 
 Dendrie Taylor as Luann Delaney 
 Sprague Grayden as Donna Winston
 Jay Karnes as Agent Joshua Kohn
 Mitch Pileggi as Ernest Darby, a member of a white supremacist gang called the Nordics  
 Emilio Rivera as Marcus Álvarez 
 Tory Kittles as Laroy Wayne 
 Taryn Manning as Cherry / Rita 
 Keir O'Donnell as Lowell Harland, Jr.
 Glenn Plummer as Sheriff Vic Trammel
 Julie Ariola as Mary Winston 
 Jamie McShane as Cameron Hayes

Guest stars
 David LaBrava as Happy Lowman 
 Patrick St. Esprit as Elliott Oswald
 Kurt Sutter as "Big" Otto Delaney 
 Olivia Burnette as Homeless Woman 
 Michael Shamus Wiles as Jury White 
 Kenneth Choi as Henry Lin 
 Michael Marisi Ornstein as Chuck Marstein
 Marcos de la Cruz as Estevez

Reception
The first season received generally positive reviews from industry critics. Matthew Gilbert of The Boston Globe said the first season had "real potential". The New York Times’ Gina Bellafante spoke highly of the cast's acting ability, particularly Sagal’s portrayal of Gemma. Brian Lowry of Variety gave a mixed review, admiring Sutter’s creation of the club and the town of Charming but observing the early episodes lacked direction.

On review aggregator website Rotten Tomatoes, the season has an approval rating of 88% based on 24 reviews. The site's critical consensus reads: "Rough and harsh, Sons of Anarchy features one of television's best ensemble casts."

Production
Although Sons of Anarchy is set in Northern California's Central Valley, it is filmed primarily at Occidental Studios Stage 5A in North Hollywood. Main sets located there include the clubhouse, St. Thomas Hospital, and Jax's house. The production rooms at the studio used by the writing staff also double as the Charming police station. External scenes are often filmed nearby in Sun Valley and Tujunga. Interior and exterior scenes set in Northern Ireland during season 3 were also filmed at Occidental Studios and surrounding areas. A second unit shot footage in Northern Ireland used in the third season.

Originally, Scott Glenn was cast in the role of Clay Morrow and an entire pilot episode was filmed with him. However, series creator Kurt Sutter decided to go in a different direction with the character and re-cast Ron Perlman in the role, and Clay's scenes were re-shot. Additionally, Emilio Rivera was originally cast as a Sons of Anarchy club member named "Hawk," who eventually evolved into the character of Tig Trager. Also, the One-Niners street gang who buy weapons from SAMCRO first appeared in The Shield, which Sutter produced.

Episodes

Home media release
The first season was released in the United States on DVD and Blu-ray on August 18, 2009.

References

External links
 Sons of Anarchy at FXNetworks.com
 

 
2008 American television seasons